Sebastian "Billy" Mure (Born on November 4, 1915 – September 25, 2013) was an American guitarist and songwriter who recorded several albums in the 1950s and 1960s in a variety of styles, including surf, Hawaiian, swing, pop, and lounge music.

Mure was born in New York City and played violin at age 9, before making guitar his primary instrument. He played in bands while in the service during World War II and found work at a radio station WNEW after the war until 1957. In addition to his solo recordings, he worked as a session musician, composer, and arranger. He wrote the popular instrumental "Toy Balloons". In 1959, he released the single "A String of Trumpets", credited to Billy Mure and the Trumpeteers; the song reached #64 on the Billboard Hot 100. Mure had been performing for the past seven years with his band—Top Hats—at Squid Lips in Sebastian, Florida.

Discography

As leader 
Super-Sonic Guitars in Hi-Fi (RCA Victor, 1957)
Fireworks (RCA Victor, 1957)
Supersonics In Flight (RCA Victor, 1959)
Supersonic Guitars (MGM Records SE3780 Stereo, 1959)
Bandstand Record Hop (United Artists Records, 1959)
A String of Trumpets (Everest Records, 1960)
Strictly Cha Cha (Everest Records, 1960)
Around The World In Percussion (Strand Records, 1961)
Tough Strings (Great Guitar Hits) (Kapp Records, 1961)
Hawaiian Percussion (Strand Records, 1961)
Blue Hawaii (Premier Records, 1963)
Teen Bossa Nova (MGM Records, 1963)
Hawaiian Moods (Spin-O-Rama Records, 1965)

As sideman 
 Paul Anka — "Diana" (reached #1)
 Frankie Laine — "Rawhide" (reached #6)
 Perry Como — "Don't Let the Stars Get in Your Eyes" (reached #1)
 Ames Brothers — "Ragg Mopp" (reached #1)
 Eddie Fisher — "Oh My Papa" (reached #1)
 Eddie Fisher — "Anytime" (reached #2)
 Don Rondo — "White Silver Sands" (reached #7)
 Marty Robbins — "White Sport Coat and a Pink Carnation" (reached #1)
 Bobby Darin — "Splish Splash" (reached #1)
 Eydie Gorme — "Blame It on the Bossa Nova" (reached #7)
 Rosemary Clooney — "Come on-a My House" (reached #1)
 Connie Francis — "Among my Souvenirs" (reached #7)
 Guy Mitchell — "Heartaches by the Number" (reached #1 on C&W listing)
 Perez Prado — "Patricia" (reached #1)
 Tony Bennett — "Because of You" (reached #1)
 Kay Starr — "Wheel of Fortune" (reached #1)
 Tony Bennett — "Cold Cold Heart" (reached #1)
 Brian Hyland — "Itsy Bitsy Teenie Weenie Yellow Polka Dot Bikini" (reached #1)
 Billy Williams — "I'm Gonna Sit Right Down and Write Myself a Letter" (reached #3)
 Johnny Mathis — "Chances Are" (reached #1)
 Patti Page — "How Much is that Doggie in the Window?" (reached #1)
 Marcie Blane — "Bobby's Girl" (reached #2) ** (Produced by Billy Mure)
 Ray Peterson — "Tell Laura I Love Her" (reached #7) ** 
 Bobby Freeman — "Do You Want to Dance" (reached #7) ** 
 Johnnie Ray — "Cry" (reached #1) Played as "Sebastian Mure" ** 
 Della Reese — "And That Reminds Me" (reached #15) ** 
 Ralph Young - "Moonlight Gambler" with orchestra conducted by Billy Mure (Everest Records 9-19324, 1960)

References

1915 births
2013 deaths
Jubilee Records artists
American military personnel of World War II
Guitarists from New York (state)
American male guitarists
20th-century American guitarists
20th-century American male musicians